Jarvis Jenkins (born April 24, 1988) is a former American football defensive end. He was drafted by the Washington Redskins in the second round of the 2011 NFL Draft. He played college football at Clemson University.

Early years
Jenkins attended D. W. Daniel High School in Central, South Carolina. He was named as an All-American by PrepStar as a senior where he had 79 tackles and four blocked kicks. He was named the South Carolina Coaches Association Upperstate AAA Lineman-of-the-Year, Daily Journal/Messenger Player-of-the-Year and was an AP All-State.

Jenkins was also a two-time All-region pick in basketball and was named All-region in the shot put (46-feet, 6-inches) and discus (111-feet, 10-inches).

Jenkins was rated as the 27th defensive tackle in the nation, and number one player in the state of South Carolina by Rivals.com. He was a member of the Rivals 250.

College career
He played college football at Clemson.

Professional career

2011 NFL Draft
He was considered one of the better defensive tackle prospects for the 2011 NFL Draft.

Washington Redskins

Jenkins was selected ninth in the second round, 41st overall, by the Washington Redskins in the 2011 NFL Draft. The Redskins signed Jenkins to a four-year, $4.783 million contract with a $1.978 million signing bonus on July 29, 2011. Jenkins missed the entire 2011 season after tearing his ACL in a preseason game against the Baltimore Ravens, spending his entire rookie season on injured reserve.

After seven months of rehabilitation, Jenkins was cleared to play on April 11, 2012. He made his NFL debut in the 2012 season opener against the New Orleans Saints.  After Adam Carriker was placed on injured reserve, Jenkins had his first career start in Week 3 against the Cincinnati Bengals.

On July 28, 2013, it was announced that Jenkins would be suspended for the first four games of the 2013 season due to violating the league's substance policy.
In Week 11, he recorded his first half a sack against the Philadelphia Eagles. The following week, he recorded a full sack on quarterback Colin Kaepernick of the San Francisco 49ers.

Chicago Bears
On March 24, 2015, Jenkins signed a one-year deal with the Chicago Bears. In fifteen starts, Jenkins recorded a career-best 32 tackles, four sacks and six tackles-for-loss.

New York Jets 
On March 16, 2016, Jenkins signed a two-year, $7 million deal with the New York Jets. He was released by the Jets on November 9, 2016.

Kansas City Chiefs 
On November 14, 2016, Jenkins signed with the Kansas City Chiefs.

On March 22, 2017, Jenkins re-signed with the Chiefs.

On March 14, 2018, Jenkins re-signed with the Chiefs. He played in 12 games in 2018 before being waived by the Chiefs on December 7, 2018.

Season statistics

References

External links
Kansas City Chiefs bio
Official website 
Washington Redskins bio 
Chicago Bears bio
New York Jets bio

1988 births
Living people
People from Clemson, South Carolina
Players of American football from South Carolina
American football defensive tackles
American football defensive ends
Clemson Tigers football players
Washington Redskins players
Chicago Bears players
New York Jets players
Kansas City Chiefs players